The Union of Free Trade Unions of Cameroon (Union des syndicats libres du Cameroun or USLC) is a trade union centre in Cameroon. The USLC is affiliated with the International Trade Union Confederation, and the Organization of African Trade Union Unity.

History 
Trade unions are permitted in Cameroon under the 1992 labor code. The Union of Free Trade Unions of Cameroon was created in 1996 by the government. The creation of the USLC was seen as a strategy by the government to weaken the influence of the Confederation of Cameroonian Trade Unions, the only labor union at the time.

In 2006, the USLC was estimated to have 50,000 members, and was then presided by Flaubert Moussolê.

References

Further reading 

Trade unions in Cameroon
International Trade Union Confederation
Organisation of African Trade Union Unity
Trade unions established in 1995
1995 establishments in Cameroon